Adolf Huber (5 March 1923 – 30 November 1993) was an Austrian football forward who played for Austria. He also played for FK Austria Wien and 1. Wiener Neustädter SC.

External links
 
 

1923 births
1993 deaths
Austrian footballers
Austria international footballers
Association football midfielders
FK Austria Wien players
1. Wiener Neustädter SC players
1. Wiener Neustädter SC managers
Austrian football managers